Nikita Yuryevich Glazkov (born 16 April 1992 in Moscow) is a Russian left-handed épée fencer, three-time team European champion, and 2021 team Olympic silver medalist.

Glazkov competed in fencing at the junior level, and was part of the winning team in team épée at the 2011 Summer Universiade in Shenchzhen. Since 2021, he fenced at professional level. In 2014, Glazkov was included to the Russian national team. His coaches are Nikolay Tokarenko and Ildar Kamaletdinov.

Glazkov is a bronze medalist in team épée at the 2017 World Fencing Championships and a 2019 European Champion, also in team épée.

Medal Record

Olympic Games

World Championship

European Championship

World Cup

References

Living people
Russian male fencers
Olympic medalists in fencing
Olympic fencers of Russia
Fencers at the 2020 Summer Olympics
Medalists at the 2020 Summer Olympics
1992 births
Olympic silver medalists for the Russian Olympic Committee athletes
21st-century Russian people